A transfusion practitioner (TP "Tee Pee", also known as Transfusion Nurse, Transfusion Safety Officer, Haemovigilance Officer, PBM Practitioner and PBM Nurse) is one with a critical role to play in developing a culture of transfusion safety, appropriateness, and Patient Blood Management (PBM) within healthcare establishments. The role is undertaken by a range of healthcare professionals, with many having nursing or science qualifications. The work of the TP varies across countries and in organisations, some are sole practitioners and others work as part of a team. Much of their work involves ensuring current clinical practices align with state, national, and international guidelines and standards.

Transfusion Practitioners improve transfusion practice by promoting safe transfusion practice in a variety of ways. The varied activities of the TP can include:
 transfusion education to clinical colleagues
 providing transfusion information for patients and families
 risk management including writing, implementing, updating and monitoring local policies and procedures
 monitoring and providing feedback on activities related to compliance with best practice guidelines including audit
 transfusion incident management including investigation
 hemovigilance follow-up and reporting activities
 managing appropriate use of blood and blood inventory
 implementing PBM (patient blood management) strategies.

In the UK the development of the Transfusion Practitioner role was part of the Department of Health "Better Blood Transfusion" strategy. Most UK hospitals now have Transfusion Practitioners, usually with a Nursing, Midwifery or Biomedical Science background. They work as part of Hospital Transfusion Team, along with the Transfusion Laboratory Manager and Clinician in charge of blood transfusion.

In Australia the hospital Transfusion Practitioner role was a key component of establishing networks of transfusion practice improvement with collaborative working between TPs at state, territory and national level. Transfusion Practitioners are recognised as drivers of quality, safety, appropriateness and PBM in association with physicians. There are varying ways that the PBM responsibility is being established in Australia by either creating dedicated PBM positions or incorporating it as part of the responsibility into other existing roles e.g. the pre-anesthetic clinic nurse role.

Haemovigilance 
Haemovigilance is the set of surveillance procedures that monitors, reports, investigates and analyzes adverse events related to transfusion. It covers the entire blood transfusion chain, from blood donation and processing of blood and its components, through to their provision and transfusion to patients. These reporting systems play a fundamental role in enhancing patient safety by learning from failures and then putting system changes in place to prevent them in the future.

The TP's involvement in haemovigilance (mainly within the hospital setting), includes the investigation and reporting of transfusion reactions and adverse events internally and externally to national haemovigilance schemes (e.g. SHOT). By conducting process reviews and communicating directly with the relevant colleagues and patients, the TP can provide essential details that are needed to complete investigations. This information assists with the final conclusion and recommendations for future transfusion plans for the patient, or the implementation of corrective and preventative measures. National haemovigilance schemes e.g. SHOT provide the Transfusion Practitioner with a resource for educating clinical colleagues on transfusion safety and recommendations for best practice.

Appropriate transfusion 
TPs can support improved practice by applying strategies such as targeted education for the appropriate clinical groups, highlighting and promoting national recommendations and undertaking regular review audits of appropriateness of blood use.

For example, the UK Patient Blood Management (PBM) recommendation 'Transfuse one dose of blood component at a time e.g. one unit of red cells or platelets in non-bleeding patients and reassess the patient clinically and with a further blood count to determine if further transfusion is needed.' A pilot study run by a TP introduced the single unit transfusion policy for non-bleeding medical patients in an acute medical unit and led to a 40-45% reduction in red cell use over a 6 month period. Implementing this change in practice involved a period of training for both clinical and laboratory staff and changes to policy. The TP is uniquely placed to drive and monitor initiatives such as this, where they engage with both clinical colleagues who make the decision to transfuse, and work with the scientific staff in the laboratory promoting the single unit transfusion policy.

Audits 
Surveillance is often achieved through audits which help to identify gaps in staff knowledge, topics for future education and contribute to quality improvement. Within the UK, the National Comparative Audit of Blood Transfusion (NCABT) is a programme of clinical audits which looks at the use and administration of blood and blood components in the NHS and independent hospitals in the UK. This audit programme's objectives are to provide evidence that blood is being prescribed and used appropriately and administered safely, and to highlight where practice is deviating from the guidelines to the possible detriment of patient care. Data collection for these audits can be undertaken by a number of health care professionals within the participating organisations, however the majority of the data collection and data submission is undertaken by the Transfusion Practitioner. Without the input of the TPs, many of these audits would not have the high volume of collected data required to give an accurate reflection of transfusion practice, and so make recommendations for improvement.

In addition to national audits, the TP is uniquely placed to undertake local audits, looking at issues identified perhaps through haemovigilance. These audits can be designed and written to suit the local healthcare environment and the findings report back to the relevant Blood Management Committee with a locally agreed action plan for any recommendations made.

Impact 
Although there is limited direct evidence for their impact, red cell use in Australia, New Zealand, the USA and the UK fell dramatically after the introduction of Transfusion Practitioners.

References 

Transfusion medicine